François Le Prévost d'Exmes (29 September 1729 in Exmes – September 1793 in Paris) was an 18th-century French writer, playwright and literary critic.

Works 
(selection)
1747–1749: Histoire générale des voyages; ou Nouvelle collection de toutes les relations de voyages par mer et par terre, qui ont été publiées jusqu’à présent dans les différentes langues de toutes les nations connues, enrichie de cartes géographiques de plans, &c., La Haye, P. DeHondt.
1752: les Thessaliennes, three-act comedy at the Comédie Italienne
1756: La Revue des feuilles de Mr. Fréron : lettres à Madame de, London
1758:  la Nouvelle Réconciliation, comedy in one act
1759: Les Trois Rivaux : opéra comique, Amsterdam, Paris, Cuissart.
1761: Réflexions sur le système des nouveaux philosophes, Francfort.
1770: Le Nouveau Spectateur : ou examen des nouvelles pièces de théâtre, dans lequel on a ajouté les ariettes notées, Geneva, Valade
1779: Lully, musicien, Paris.
1782: Étrennes du Parnasse. Choix de Poésies, Paris, Couturier.
1784: Vies des écrivains étrangers, tant anciens que modernes ; accompagnées de divers morceaux de leurs ouvrages, Paris, Veuve Duchesne.

Notes

Sources 
 François-Xavier de Feller, Supplément au dictionnaire historique, Lyon, Méquignon, 1819
 Édouard Frère, Manuel du bibliographe normand, Rouen, Le Brument, 1860
 Jean Chrétien Ferdinand Hoefer, Nouvelle biographie générale, Paris, Firmin-Didot, 1872, vol.XLI, (p. 11–12)

External links 
 François LE PRÉVOST D'EXMES (1729-1793) on  Dictionnaire des journalistes (1600-1789)
 François LE PREVOST D'EXMES & Joseph de LAPORTE, La revue des feuilles de Mr. Freron on Éditions originales
 Julien Le Roy Horloger on Chayette-Cheval

18th-century French writers
18th-century French male writers
Writers from Normandy
French literary critics
18th-century French dramatists and playwrights
1729 births
1793 deaths